Kabir Bedi  (born 16 January 1946) is an Indian actor. His career has spanned three continents covering India, the United States and especially Italy among other European countries in three media: film, television and theatre. He is noted for his role as Emperor Shah Jahan in Taj Mahal: An Eternal Love Story and the villainous Sanjay Verma in the 1980s blockbuster Khoon Bhari Maang. He is best known in Italy and Europe for playing the pirate Sandokan in the popular Italian TV miniseries and for his role as the villainous Gobinda in the 1983 James Bond film Octopussy. Bedi is based in India and lives in Mumbai.

Early life and education 
Kabir Bedi was born in Lahore in the Punjab Province of British India (now in Punjab, Pakistan) on 16 January 1946 into a Punjabi Khatri Sikh family of the Bedi clan that had devoted itself to India's fight for independence from British colonial rule. He was one of three children. His father, Baba Pyare Lal Singh Bedi, was an author and philosopher. His mother, Freda Bedi, was a British woman born in Derby, England, who became famous as the first Western woman to take ordination in Tibetan Buddhism. He was educated at Sherwood College, Nainital, Uttarakhand, and St. Stephen's College, Delhi.

Career 
Bedi began his career in Indian theatre and then moved on to Hindi films. He remains one of the first international actors from India who started out in Hindi films, worked in Hollywood films and became a star in Europe.

Stage acting 
As a stage actor, Bedi has performed Shakespeare's Othello as well as portrayed a historical Indian king in Tughlaq, and a self-destructive alcoholic in The Vultures. In London he starred in The Far Pavilions, the West End musical adaptation of M. M. Kaye's novel, at the Shaftesbury Theatre.
In 2011 Bedi played Emperor Shah Jahan in Taj, a play written by John Murrell, a Canadian playwright for the Luminato Festival in Toronto. In 2013, this play was recommissioned and went on an eight-week multi-city tour of Canada.

Film career 
In the James Bond film Octopussy, Bedi played the villain's aide Gobinda.

He has acted in over 60 Indian films. In the historical epic Taj Mahal: An Eternal Love Story, he starred as the Emperor Shah Jahan. Other starring Hindi film roles include Raj Khosla's Kacche Dhaage, Rakesh Roshan's Khoon Bhari Maang and Farah Khan's Main Hoon Na.

Bedi shot a movie with Hrithik Roshan (Kites), Govinda (Showman), and Akshay Kumar (Blue). He also starred in Deepa Mehta's film, Kamagata Maru with Amitabh Bachchan and John Abraham. He acted in the Tamil film Aravaan, directed by Vasanthabalan.

Bedi played roles in Columbia Pictures' The Beast of War, a film on the Russian war in Afghanistan, directed by Kevin Reynolds, as well as the acclaimed Italian film Andata Ritorno, by Marco Ponti, winner of the David di Donatello Award.
In 2017, he acted in the Telugu historical movie Gautamiputra Satakarni, as Nahapana, an important ruler of the Western Kshatrapas.

Television career 
Bedi has appeared on American television, in Hallmark's African epic Forbidden Territory, and Ken Follett's On Wings of Eagles and Red Eagle. He played Friar Sands in The Lost Empire, for NBC. He also acted in Dynasty, Murder, She Wrote, Magnum, P.I., Hunter, Knight Rider and Highlander: The Series.

In Europe, his greatest success was Sandokan, the saga of a romantic Southeast Asian pirate during British colonial times, an Italian-German-French TV series which broke viewership records across Europe. He recently starred in a prime-time Italian television series, Un Medico in Famiglia, on RAI TV.

For over a year, Bedi starred in The Bold and the Beautiful, the second most-watched television show in the world, seen by over a billion people in 149 countries.

He had his own cinematic talk show on Indian TV, Director's Cut, a 13-part special series interviewing the country's leading directors. His success on television continued in 2013 with award-winning prime-time shows Guns and Glory: The Indian Soldier and Vandemataram, for India's news channels Headlines Today and Aaj Tak.

In the Indian Biblical television series 'Bible Ki Kahaniya', Bedi played both the young and aged Abraham.

Radio career 
In 2007 he starred in Chat, a radio show aired by RAI Radio2, in the role of Sandokan. In 2012, he did a series of Radio One programmes titled Women of Gold and Men of Steel in honour of industry champions in India. In 2017 he did another series in English for Radio One, Ten on Ten, celebrating the top ten innovations out of India. He also did the year-end special series, Best of 2017.

Writing 
Bedi is a regular contributor to Indian publications including the Times of India and Tehelka on political and social issues affecting the country. He is also seen debating such topics on Indian national television.

Charity 
In February 2017, Bedi was announced as the new 'brand ambassador' for international development organisation, Sightsavers, saying on his appointment, "Today there is immense awareness and attempt towards eye health and care in India and Sightsavers have shown way to people at large in the country with their achievements in the area of eye care."
Bedi is the honorary brand ambassador for Italian Charity Care and Share Italia, which educates and looks after street children, from school to university, in Andhra Pradesh and Telegana.

Awards and achievements 
Since 1982 Bedi has been a voting member of the Academy of Motion Picture Arts and Sciences (who are responsible for presenting the Oscar awards). He is also a voting member of the Screen Actors Guild.

He has won numerous film, advertising and popularity awards across Europe and India.

By decree of the President of the Italian Republic of 2 June 2010, Bedi was officially knighted. He received the highest ranking civilian honour of the Italian Republic and was bestowed the title of "Cavaliere" (Knight) of the Order of Merit of the Italian Republic. He has recently received Honorary Degree from Kalinga Institute of Industrial Technology (KIIT) University, Bhubaneswar, Odisha, India.

Personal life 
Bedi married four times and had three children, Pooja, Siddharth (deceased) and Adam. He was married to Protima Bedi, an Odissi dancer. Their daughter Pooja Bedi is a magazine/newspaper columnist and former actress. Their son, Siddharth, who went to Carnegie Mellon University, was diagnosed with schizophrenia and died by suicide in 1997 at the age of 26.

As his marriage with Protima began to break down, he started a relationship with Parveen Babi. They never married. He later married British-born fashion designer Susan Humphreys. Their son, Adam Bedi, is an international model who made his Hindi film debut with the thriller Hello? Kaun Hai! This marriage ended in divorce.

In the early 1990s, Bedi married TV and radio presenter Nikki Bedi. They had no children and divorced in 2005. After that, Bedi has been in a relationship with British-born Parveen Dusanj, whom he married a day before his 70th birthday.

Bedi supports the anti-government struggle in Myanmar, and he is an official ambassador of the Burma Campaign UK. He is the brand ambassador for Rotary International South Asia for its Teach Programme and the Total Literacy Mission in India and South Asia.

Filmography

Films

Television

Reality shows

Radio

Dubbing roles

Live action films

Voiceovers in ads and commercials

Voting memberships

References

External links 
 
 
 

1946 births
Punjabi people
Indian Sikhs
English Sikhs
Indian male film actors
Indian male voice actors
Living people
Indian expatriates in Italy
Delhi University alumni
Indian people of English descent
Male actors from Lahore